Toumbouroum (also Toumbourou) is a village in the commune of Martap, in the Adamawa Region of Cameroon, in the Vina department of Cameroon.

Population 
In 1967,  Toumbouroum counted 132 inhabitants, mainly Fula people.

At the time of the 2005 census, there were 73 people in the village.

References

Bibliography 
 Jean Boutrais (ed.), Peuples et cultures de l'Adamaoua (Cameroun) : actes du colloque de Ngaoundéré, du 14 au 16 janvier 1992, ORSTOM, Paris ; Ngaoundéré-Anthropos, 1993, 316 p. 
 Dictionnaire des villages de l'Adamaoua, ONAREST, Yaoundé, October 1974, 133 p.

External links 
 Martap, on the website Communes et villes unies du Cameroun (CVUC)

Populated places in Adamawa Region